Mother Goose's Little Treasures is a 2007 children's picture book by Iona Opie. It is a collection of nursery rhymes, some little known, chosen by Opie from the Mother Goose oeuvre.

Contents
Little Treasures contains 22 nursery rhymes:

Here comes Solomon 
The leaves are green 
Intery, mintery 
Handy Spandy 
Rosy apple 
Mrs. Whirly 
Parcel post 
Sing, sing 
In and out the windows 
Little fatty doctor 
Oats and beans and barley 
Wee melodie man 
Chick chick chick chick 
What the goose thinketh 
Mother, may I? 
Little old dog sits under a chair 
Uncle John 
Cockle shells 
Going to Kentucky 
The moon shines bright 
My maid Mary 
Before it gets dark.

Reception
In a star review, Booklist wrote "This gem, comprising 22 tidbits from little-known nursery rhymes, shines with the charm of old-time rhymes and with Wells' beloved animal and child characters, set down in her signature style." and concludes "this third Opie-Wells treasury of treasures is likely to become a staple in children's collections." and the School Library Journal found "The very nature of this book makes it a less-essential purchase than this team's My Very First Mother Goose (1996) or Here Comes Mother Goose (1999, both Candlewick), so possibly only larger collections or libraries with lots of Rosemary Wells fans will want it." 

Kirkus Reviews wrote "The pictures may suggest scenarios for some of the more abstract lines here, but young goslings will still benefit most not by trying to make sense of the gnomic verses, but just listening to the rhythms of sound and language in them." Publishers Weekly stated "this is less a title for Everytoddler than one for lovers of rhyme and verse." while The New York Times, commenting on Opie's introduction, found her "more the Jungian than the scientist." and that "Wells’s pictures for Opie’s collection don’t go far enough in the originality direction."

See also

Histoires ou contes du temps passé
Mother Goose in Prose
My Very First Mother Goose
The Random House Book of Mother Goose

References

External links
Bulletin of the Center for Children's Books review
Library holdings of Little Treasures

2007 children's books
British children's books
Collections of nursery rhymes
American picture books